Inhibitor of growth protein 3 is a protein that in humans is encoded by the ING3 gene.

The protein encoded by this gene is similar to ING1, a tumor suppressor protein that can interact with TP53, inhibit cell growth, and induce apoptosis. This protein contains a PHD finger, which is a common motif in proteins involved in chromatin remodeling. This gene can activate p53 trans-activated promoters, including promoters of p21/waf1 and bax. Overexpression of this gene has been shown to inhibit cell growth and induce apoptosis. Allelic loss and reduced expression of this gene were detected in head and neck cancers. Two alternatively spliced transcript variants encoding different isoforms have been observed.

References

Further reading